Nicholas Bakay (born October 8, 1959) is an American actor, comedian, writer, producer and sports commentator. He is known as the voice of Salem Saberhagen on ABC/The WB's Sabrina the Teenage Witch, Sabrina: The Animated Series, and Norbert Beaver on The Angry Beavers. He played Karl on the Fox sitcom 'Til Death as well as serving as a producer of the show until it was cancelled by Fox. He is also one of the executive producers of the CBS sitcom Mom.

Early life
Nicholas Bakay was born on October 8, 1959 in Buffalo, New York, where he attended Nichols School. He graduated from Kenyon College in 1981. He has Hungarian roots (his surname means "from Baka").

Career
Bakay served as a writer of Sabrina the Teenage Witch, in which he also voiced Salem Saberhagen, a witch who has been transformed into the Spellman family's pet cat for trying to take over the world. Bakay also served as a writer for Sabrina: The Animated Series, also providing his voice as Salem as well. He was also the voice of Norbert on The Angry Beavers.

Bakay is a lifelong sports fan. He writes a weekly column for NFL.com called "Nick Bakay's Manly House of Football", as well as occasional columns for ESPN.com and ESPN The Magazine. He appears on SportsCenter on ESPN Wednesday and Thursday mornings during NFL season, and has frequently done segments on NFL Total Access on NFL Network. Bakay also has guest hosted numerous episodes of Up Close and Talk2, as well as contributed to Jim Rome Is Burning and numerous other sports shows.

Early in his career he wrote the storylines for the Evil Clown Comics series which appeared in National Lampoon magazine. From 1993 to 1994, he was a writer for the comedy sketch series In Living Color, and appeared as Stu Dunfy, the host of the fictional game show The Dirty Dozens. He worked at Comedy Central, writing and appearing on numerous shows, including Night After Night with Allan Havey and Sports Monster.

Beginning in 2000, Bakay worked as a producer on the CBS hit comedy The King of Queens, where he also wrote and acted in several episodes. He co-wrote Paul Blart: Mall Cop (2009) as well as its sequel Paul Blart: Mall Cop 2 (2015) with King of Queens star Kevin James.

In 2006, Bakay created, wrote and voiced a cartoon for Comedy Central called The Adventures of Baxter and McGuire, which was nominated for an Emmy in the "Best Broadband Comedy" category.

From 2006 to 2010, Bakay served as a producer for and acted in the Fox comedy 'Til Death.

In 2013, Bakay began as a producer for the series Mom. Bakay also voiced the self-help radio announcer throughout the series.

Guest appearances
Bakay has guest-starred on numerous TV sitcoms. He appeared on In Living Color in a semi-recurring role as Stu Dunfy, guest-host of the sketch "The Dirty Dozens" (and other voice work). He also appeared on the Seinfeld episode "The Smelly Car" where Bakay played Elaine's boyfriend.

Bakay was seen or heard on That '70s Show. In the episode "Ski Trip", Bakay played Gus, a gay truck driver attracted to Kelso. In another episode, he was the voice of Donna's journal. In "An Eric Forman Christmas", he was the voice of Santa Claus in Kelso's Rankin-Bass-modeled dream.

Bakay had numerous recurring roles (such as Father McDaniel, Gus and miscellaneous voice work) on The King of Queens, which he also served as a producer and writer on. In the sitcom Ellen, Bakay starred as bookstore employee Lloyd in the second seasons' tenth episode, alongside comedian Ellen DeGeneres.

He had a supporting role on two late night talk shows: Night After Night with Allan Havey and Dennis Miller's short-lived show.

Personal life
Bakay has been married to his wife Robin, since February 20, 1994.

In 2009, Bakay sold his condo home in West Hollywood for $2 million. He now lives in the Hollywood Hills.

Filmography

Film

Television

Video games

Production work

References

External links

 

1959 births
Male actors from Buffalo, New York
American people of Hungarian descent
American male comedians
American male screenwriters
American male television actors
American television sports announcers
Television producers from New York (state)
American television writers
American male voice actors
Kenyon College alumni
Living people
American male television writers
Comedians from New York (state)
American male non-fiction writers
Screenwriters from New York (state)